The Casting Guild of Australia (CGA) is a professional society, founded in 2013 in Victoria, Australia. It consists over 90% of all Australian casting directors for film, television, and theatre.

Formation
According to Nick Hamon, casting director and Vice President of CGA that the idea of setting up a casting guild was in minds of Australian casting directors committee quite sometime. But it was not actualised until in 2013, committee member Mel Mackintosh wrote an email, emphasising on the need of the guild.

Nominations and winners
The winners are mentioned first and highlighted.

2015

2016

Sirius Award
The Sirius Award has been created to recognise Australia's emerging actors, modelled on the Berlin Film Festival's Shooting Stars initiative. In 2015 Mark Coles Smith and Odessa Young won the award. In 2016 the Sirius Award were given to Katherine Langford and Jacob Collins Levy.

See also
 List of television awards

References

External links
Casting Guild of Australia Website
Casting Guild of Australia at IMDB

Entertainment industry societies
Australian film awards
Australian television awards
Casting awards